The 1991 Virginia Slims of Florida was a women's tennis tournament played on outdoor clay courts in Boca Raton, Florida in the United States that was part of Tier I of the 1991 WTA Tour. It was the 13th edition of the tournament and was held from March 4 through March 10, 1991. Second seeded Gabriela Sabatini won the singles title, her second consecutive at the event and third in total.

Entrants

Seeds

Other entrants
The following players received wildcards into the singles main draw:
  Ann Grossman
  Barbara Rittner

The following players received entry from the qualifying draw:

  Halle Cioffi
  Catherine Suire
  Shaun Stafford
  Julie Shiflet
  Bettina Fulco
  Samantha Smith
  Michelle Jackson-Nobrega
  Louise Allen

Finals

Singles

 Gabriela Sabatini defeated  Steffi Graf 6–4, 7–6(8–6)
 It was Sabatini's 2nd singles title of the year and the 17th of her career.

Doubles

 Larisa Neiland /  Natasha Zvereva defeated  Meredith McGrath /  Samantha Smith 6–4, 7–6(7–3)
 It was Neiland's 2nd title of the year and the 20th of her career. It was Zvereva's 3rd title of the year and the 14th of her career.

External links
 ITF tournament edition details
 Tournament draws

Virginia Slims of Florida
Virginia Slims of Florida
Virginia Slims of Florida
Virginia Slims of Florida
Virginia Slims of Florida